Valley View is a tourist spot in Ooty, India. It has views over the Ketti valley, and is an important tourist centre in Ooty. Ketti valley is sometimes referred to as the Switzerland of Southern India. The valley extends from the Mysore plateau to the Coimbatore plains and is one of the largest valleys in the world.

See also
 Ooty Lake
 Stone House, Ooty
 Mariamman temple, Ooty
 Ooty Golf Course
 St. Stephen's Church, Ooty

References

Geography of Ooty